The Campus is a Ugandan drama television series created by Philip Ashaba and starring Elvis Mutebi Andrew, Katusiime Stephen, Gloria Adrian, Uwi Mbabazi, Muhawenimana Sarafina, Dolliyantha Phiona, Marie Corrazon, Kalemba Timothy, Kyomugisha Harmony Mwezi and Philip Luswata. The series, produced by Buddies Productions, airs on NBS TV Thursdays and Fridays at 8:30 Pm and is considered a hot rival for NTV's The Hostel.

Plot
Andrew (Steven Katusiime) had  lived a single life but after joining campus meets friends with different characters whose life is a series of fun twists and turns, full of drama and reality.

Production
The Campus pilot episode was shot in 2007, thirteen years after the initial writing of the series. It was initially presented to Theater Factory before it disbanded. The series came back into production in 2013 and then shortly eight completed episodes scripts were stolen on a hard disc. The series first came to a hiatus before resuming in 2015 with fresh cast that including sensational Ugandan film actor Mutebi Andrew Elvis who carried the entire series as the protagonist Joel, production and crew. NBS TV picked up  and started airing the series in 2016.

See also
Beneath The Lies
Yat Madit
Deception NTV
Balikoowa in the City
Coffee Shop (TV Series)
The Hostel (TV Series)

References

Ugandan drama television series
2016 Ugandan television series debuts
2010s Ugandan television series
NBS Television (Uganda) original programming